Ravenstonedale is a village and large civil parish in Cumbria, on the watershed between the River Lune and River Eden. The parish includes the village of Newbiggin-on-Lune and several smaller settlements including Bowderdale, Brownber, Greenside, Stennerskeugh, Wath and Weasdale. The parish had a population of 570 in 2001, increasing to 594 at the 2011 Census.

Historically also known as "Russendale", the parish is divided into four parts (known as 'angles'): Town, Newbiggin-on-Lune, Bowderdale and Fell End.
The origin and etymology of the name are obscure. An alternative spelling may be Rausyngdale 

The parish was historically in the county of Westmorland.  Since 2016 it has been within the Yorkshire Dales National Park.

Village
The village is centred on a single main street, though there are many scattered dwellings on the periphery.  Slightly to the south east of the village centre are the buildings of the former Ravenstonedale Endowed School. It closed in 2015. There are two inns in the village, and one about two miles outside at Fell End.

St Oswald's church

The parish church, dedicated to St Oswald, dates mainly from the rebuild in the 18th century. The tower dates from 1738, and the rest is of 1744. It has an interesting interior where rows of box pews face a central aisle in the collegiate style. There is a very good example of a three-decker pulpit. 
To the north of the church are the excavated remains of a Gilbertine priory built in the 12th century, which can still be viewed. There is an interpretation board

Governance
An electoral ward in the same name exists. This ward stretches north to Great Strickland and has a population taken at the 2011 Census of 976.

Transport links
The village is just off the A685 which runs from  Junction 38 of the M6 at Tebay through Kirkby Stephen and connects with the A66 at Brough. The village was served by Ravenstonedale railway station (located to the west of Newbiggin-on-Lune), but it closed to passengers in 1952, and to goods traffic in 1962. The nearest station is Kirkby Stephen railway station which is about 4 miles away by road, and is on the main Settle-Carlisle Line. Ravenstonedale is currently the northern terminus of the Pennine Bridleway.

Notable people
Thomas Dixon, senior

Gallery

See also

Listed buildings in Ravenstonedale

References

External links

 Cumbria County History Trust: Ravenstonedale (nb: provisional research only – see Talk page)
 Ravenstonedale Priory
 Ravenstonedale community website
 Ravenstonedale Priory & St Oswald's Church

 
Villages in Cumbria
Westmorland
Civil parishes in Cumbria
Eden District